Jean-Jacques Panunzi (born 5 April 1956 in Ajaccio, Corse-du-Sud) is a member of the French Senate.  He represents the Corse-du-Sud department, and is a member of the Republican Party.

Biography 

After attending high school in Sartène and enlisting in the armée de terre, in the commandos parachutistes in Toulouse, Jean-Jacques Panunzi chose in 1978 to return to live in Corsica and work in rural areas. Thus he participated in the development of the family carpentry business in Sorbollano, in Corse-du-Sud. His return also marks his first steps in politics.

References

1956 births
Living people
Politicians from Ajaccio
Republican Party (France) politicians
21st-century French politicians
Members of the Corsican Assembly
French Senators of the Fifth Republic
Senators of Corse-du-Sud